This article contains a list of Nike, Inc. sponsorships.

Nike pays top athletes in many sports to use their products and promote and advertise their technology and design.

Nike's first professional athlete endorser was Romanian tennis player Ilie Năstase. The first track endorser was distance runner Steve Prefontaine. Prefontaine was the prized pupil of the company's co-founder, Bill Bowerman, while he coached at the University of Oregon. Today, the Steve Prefontaine Building is named in his honor at Nike's corporate headquarters.

Nike has also sponsored many other successful track and field athletes over the years, such as Carl Lewis, Jackie Joyner-Kersee and Sebastian Coe.  The signing of basketball player Michael Jordan in 1984, with his subsequent promotion of Nike over the course of his career, with Spike Lee as Mars Blackmon, proved to be one of the biggest boosts to Nike's publicity and sales.

Nike is a major sponsor of the athletic programs at Penn State University and named its first child care facility after Joe Paterno when it opened in 1990 at the company's headquarters. Nike originally announced it would not remove Paterno's name from the building in the wake of the Penn State sex abuse scandal. After the Freeh Report was released on July 12, 2012, Nike CEO Mark Parker announced the name Joe Paterno would be removed immediately from the child development center. A new name has yet to be announced.

Nike also sponsored soccer players such as Ronaldinho, Ronaldo, Cristiano Ronaldo, Didier Drogba, Neymar, Zlatan Ibrahimović, Wesley Sneijder, Wayne Rooney and Landon Donovan, among others.

In January 2013, Nike signed Rory McIlroy, the then-number one golfer in the world, to a ten-year sponsorship deal worth $250 million. The deal includes using Nike's range of golf clubs, a move Nick Faldo previously described as "dangerous" for McIlroy's game.

On February 21, 2013, Nike announced it suspended its contract with Oscar Pistorius, due to him being charged with premeditated murder.

Nike manufactures and provides kit uniforms for a wide range of teams around the world. Some of the most important clubs and associations sponsored by the company are listed below.

American football
  NFL (all teams uniforms)

Association football

International confederations
 AFC (Referee kits only)
 CONCACAF  (Match ball only)
 CONMEBOL  (Match ball only)
 UEFA (Women's national team competitions only)

National teams

Africa

Asia

Europe

North America

Oceania

South America

Non-national representative teams

   Adygea
 
 
  Karen

Clubs teams

Africa

 Egypt
 ENPPI
 Future FC
 ZED
 Morocco
 Moghreb Tétouan
 Mozambique
 UD Songo
 Senegal
 Diambars FC
 South Africa
 Kaizer Chiefs  (Until 2022-2023 season)
 Tunisia

Asia

 Bahrain
 Riffa S.C.
 China
 Beijing Guoan
 Cangzhou Mighty Lions
 Changchun Yatai
 Chengdu Rongcheng
 Dalian Pro
 Guangzhou
 Guangzhou City
 Hebei
 Henan Songshan Longmen
 Meizhou Hakka
 Shandong Taishan
 Shanghai Port
 Shanghai Shenhua
 Shenzhen FC
 Tianjin Jinmen Tiger
 Wuhan
 Wuhan Three Towns
 Zhejiang
 Guam
 Rovers FC
 Hong Kong
 Kitchee
 Japan
 Kashima Antlers
 Sanfrecce Hiroshima
 Urawa Red Diamonds
 Yomiuri Giants
 Malaysia
 Johor Darul Ta'zim F.C.
 Johor Darul Ta'zim F.C. II
 Oman
 Dhofar Club
 Al-Ittihad Club
 Qatar
 Al Ahli
 Saudi Arabia
 Al-Ittihad
 Singapore
 Young Lions FC
 Thailand
 Chonburi
 Turkmenistan
 FC Energetik
 Merw
 United Arab Emirates
 Al Ain
 Shabab Al Ahli Dubai
 Uzbekistan
 Bunyodkor
  Sogdiana

Europe

 Andorra
 FC Andorra 
 Armenia
 FC West Armenia
 Austria
 Austria Wien
 FC Liefering
 Red Bull Salzburg
 St. Pölten
 SK Sturm Graz
 SV Lafnitz
 SV Kematen
 Wacker Innsbruck
 Azerbaijan
 Neftçi
 Sabah
 Belarus
 Arsenal Dzerzhinsk
 Orsha
 Belgium
 Dender
 Genk
 Westerlo
 Bosnia and Herzegovina
 NK Čelik Zenica
 FK Zvijezda 09
 Bulgaria
 Etar Veliko Tarnovo
 Lokomotiv Plovdiv
 Ludogorets
 Crimea
 Gvardeyets
 Sevastopol
 Croatia
 Junak Sinj
 Cyprus
 AO Ayia Napa
 Nea Salamis Famagusta
 Czech Republic
 1. SK Prostějov
 Opava
 Slovan Liberec
 Zbrojovka Brno
 Denmark
 Midtjylland
 FC Nordsjælland
 Nykøbing FC
 Skive IK
 England
 Birmingham City
 Brighton & Hove Albion
 Chelsea
 Coventry Copsewood
 Dagenham & Redbridge
 Hackney Wick
 Harborough Town
 Liverpool 
 Portsmouth
 Preston North End  (Until 2022-2023 season)
 South Shields
 Sunderland 
 Tottenham Hotspur
 Estonia
 Elva
 Flora
 Kuressaare
 Narva Trans
 Paide Linnameeskond
 Tammeka
 Vaprus
 Finland
 Inter Turku
 VPS
 France
 Angers (From 2023-2024 season)
 Cannes
 FBBP01
 Grenoble
 Martigues
 Montpellier
 Paris Saint-Germain
 Sochaux
 Georgia
 FC Gagra
 Germany 
 1. FC Kaiserslautern
 1860 Munich
 Chemie Leipzig
 Eintracht Frankfurt
 FC Eilenburg
 FC Erzgebirge Aue
 Hannoverscher SC
 Hansa Rostock
 Hertha BSC
 Hertha BSC II
 KSV Hessen Kassel
 Offenbacher Kickers
 SC Freiburg
 SC Freiburg II
  SC Victoria Hamburg
 Sonnenhof Großaspach
 SV Babelsberg 03
 TSV Buchbach
 SV Eintracht Trier 05
 SV Elversberg
 SV Heimstetten
 SV Lichtenberg 47
 SV Meppen
 TSV Havelse
 TSV Schott Mainz
 TSV Steinbach Haiger
 VfL Wolfsburg
 Gibraltar
 Glacis United
 Greece
 AEK Athens 
 Apollon Pontus
 Anagennisi Karditsa
 Diagoras
 Olympiacos Volos
 Thesprotos
 Hungary
 BFC Siófok
 Ferencváros
 MTK Budapest
 Soroksár SC
 Iceland
 FH
 Keflavík
 KR
 Ireland
 Bray Wanderers 
 Israel
 Ashdod
 Maccabi Haifa
 Italy
 Afragolese
 Alba-Audace
 Ascoli
 Benevento
 Cosenza
 Inter
 Latina
 Lavello
 Sambenedettese
 Viterbese
 Kazakhstan
 Kairat Almaty
 Kyzylzhar Petropavl
 Maktaaral
 Taraz
 Latvia
 Daugavpils
 Jelgava
 Metta/LU
 RFS
 Spartaks Jūrmala
 Valmiera
 Lithuania
 Banga Gargždai
 Nevėžis
 Riteriai
 Žalgiris
 Malta
 Birkirkara
 Valletta
 Moldova
 Speranța Nisporeni
 Montenegro
 Jezero Plav
 Netherlands
 AZ Alkmaar 
 MVV Maastricht
 NAC Breda
 Utrecht
 Vitesse
 Northern Ireland
 Coleraine
 Glenavon
 Glentoran
 Larne
 Norway
 Brann
 Stabæk
 Poland
 Puszcza Niepołomice
 Ruch Chorzów
 Stomil Olsztyn
 Warta Poznań
 Śląsk Wrocław
 Wieczysta Kraków
 Zagłębie Lubin
 Portugal
 Lusitânia
 Sporting 
 Romania
 CFR Cluj
 Farul Constanța
 FCSB
 Hermannstadt
 Rapid București
 Viitorul Târgu Jiu
 Voluntari
 Russia
 Kuban Krasnodar
 Leningradets
 Spartak Moscow
 Ural Yekaterinburg
 Yenisey Krasnoyarsk
 San Marino
 La Fiorita
 Virtus
 Scotland
 Livingston
 Serbia
 Grafičar Beograd
 Novi Pazar
 Partizan
 Slovakia
 Rohožník
 Sereď
 Žilina
 Slovenia
 Celje
 Spain
 Amorebieta
 Atlético Madrid
 Atlético Madrid B
 Barcelona
 Barcelona Atlètic
 Elche
 Elche CF Ilicitano 
 Eldense
 Huesca
 Huesca B
 Mallorca
 Mallorca B
 San Fernando
 SS Reyes
 Sweden
 AIK
 Brommapojkarna
 Landskrona BoIS
 Qviding
 Sylvia
 Switzerland
 FC Rapperswil-Jona
 Young Boys
 Zürich
 Turkey
 Antalyaspor
 Altay
 Ankara Keçiörengücü
 Çaykur Rizespor
 Erzurumspor
 Galatasaray
 Gaziantep
 Gençlerbirliği
 Hatayspor
 Kayserispor
 Ümraniyespor
 Ukraine
 Dnipro-1
 Kolos Kovalivka
 Oleksandriya
 Vorskla Poltava
 Zorya Luhansk
 Wales
 Bangor City
 Connah's Quay Nomads

North America

 Belize
 Belmopan Bandits
 Orange Walk FC
 Canada
 Blue Devils FC
 Jamaica
 Portmore United F.C.
 Tivoli Gardens F.C.
 Mexico
 América
 Cancún F.C.
 C.D. Muxes
 Pumas UNAM
 United States
 Birmingham Legion FC
 Jacksonville Armada FC

Oceania
 
 Australia
 South Hobart FC
 Canberra FC
 Tigers FC
 Tahiti
 Dragon  
 Pirae

South America

 Argentina
 San Lorenzo
 Brazil
 Corinthians
 Red Bull Brasil
 Colombia
 Atlético Nacional
 Paraguay
 Olimpia  
 Peru
 Alianza Lima

Players

Albania
  Nedim Bajrami
  Armando Broja
  Rey Manaj
  Thomas Strakosha
  Myrto Uzuni
  Giacomo Vrioni
Algeria
  Youcef Atal
  Ismaël Bennacer
  Ramy Bensebaini
  Rachid Ghezzal
  Riyad Mahrez
  Islam Slimani
Angola
  Fábio Abreu
  Hélder Costa
  Afimico Pululu
  Jonás Ramalho
Argentina
  Marcos Acuña
  Thiago Almada
  Franco Armani
  Willy Caballero
  Franco Cervi
  Enzo Fernández
  Ramiro Funes Mori
  Nahuel Guzmán
  Mauro Icardi
  Manuel Lanzini
  Lautaro Martínez
  Lisandro Martínez
  Maximiliano Meza
  Nahuel Molina
  Gonzalo Montiel
  Nicolás Otamendi
  Javier Pastore
  Leandro Paredes
  Germán Pezzella
  Enzo Pérez
  Marcos Rojo
  Cristian Romero
  Sergio Romero
  Marcos Senesi
  Giovanni Simeone
  Nicolás Tagliafico
Armenia
  Tigran Barseghyan
  Vahan Bichakhchyan
  Norberto Briasco
  Zhirayr Shaghoyan
  Artyom Simonyan
Australia
  Daniel Arzani
  Keanu Baccus
  Jason Cummings
  Thomas Deng
  Mitchell Duke
  Caitlin Foord
  Craig Goodwin
  Ajdin Hrustic
  Fran Karacic
  Elise Kellond-Knight 
  Sam Kerr
  Joel King
  Garang Kuol
  Mathew Leckie
  Awer Mabil
  Riley McGree
  Jamie Maclaren
  Aaron Mooy
  Mathew Ryan
  Harry Souttar
  Marco Tilio
  Bailey Wright
Austria
  Julian Baumgartlinger
  Stefan Ilsanker
  Saša Kalajdžić
  Konrad Laimer
  Marcel Sabitzer
  Nicolas Seiwald
  Cican Stanković
  Andreas Ulmer
  Andreas Weimann
  Hannes Wolf
Azerbaijan
  Mahir Madatov
  Emin Mahmudov
  Gara Garayev
Bahrain
  Abdulla Yusuf Helal
Belarus
  Ivan Bakhar
  Max Ebong
  Vitali Lisakovich
  Ilya Shkurin
Belgium
  Toby Alderweireld
  Dedryck Boyata
  Yannick Carrasco
  Koen Casteels
  Nacer Chadli
  Thibaut Courtois 
  Zeno Debast
  Kevin De Bruyne
  Jason Denayer
  Leander Dendoncker
  Jérémy Doku
  Wout Faes
  Marouane Fellaini
  Eden Hazard
  Thorgan Hazard
  Adnan Januzaj
  Dodi Lukebakio
  Romelu Lukaku
  Orel Mangala
  Dries Mertens
  Simon Mignolet
  Charlt Musonda
  Radja Nainggolan
  Amadou Onana
  Divock Origi
  Dennis Praet
  Matz Sels
  Youri Tielemans
  Hans Vanaken
  Jan Vertonghen
Benim
  Jodel Dossou
  Steve Mounié
  Cebio Soukou
  Olivier Verdon
Bermuda
   Nahki Wells
Bolivia
  Alejandro Chumacero
  Erwin Saavedra
Bosnia and Herzegovina
  Anel Ahmedhodžić
  Gojko Cimirot
  Ermedin Demirović
  Haris Hajradinović
  Rade Krunić
  Adi Nalić
  Stjepan Radeljić
  Edin Višća
Brazil
  Andressinha
  Andressa Alves
  Yuri Alberto
  Allan
  Renato Augusto
  Gabriel Barbosa
  Alisson Becker
  Bernard
  Beatriz
  Casemiro
  Philippe Coutinho
  Douglas Costa
  Matheus Cunha
  Danilo
  Debinha
  Emerson Royal
  Everton
  Fred
  Gerson
  Giuliano
  Marcelo Grohe
  Luiz Gustavo
  Bruno Henrique
  Roger Ibañez
  Joelinton
  Vinícius Júnior
  Lucas Leiva
  Renan Lodi
  Douglas Luiz
  Malcom
  Marquinhos
  Lucas Paquetá
  Alan Patrick
  Paulinho
  Pepê
  Giovana Queiroz
  Éverton Ribeiro
  Richarlison
  Rodrygo
  Alex Sandro
  Douglas Santos
  Raphael Veiga
  Wendel
Brunei
  Faiq Bolkiah 
Bulgaria
  Kiril Despodov
  Stanislav Ivanov
  Bozhidar Kraev
  Anton Nedyalkov
Burkina Faso
  Bryan Dabo
Burundi
  Cédric Amissi
  Youssouf Ndayishimiye
Cameroon
  Vincent Aboubakar
  André-Frank Zambo Anguissa
  Christian Bassogog
  Pierre Kunde
  Georges-Kévin Nkoudou
  Bryan Mbeumo
  Moumi Ngamaleu
  Olivier Ntcham
  Jean-Pierre Nsame
  James Léa Siliki
Canada
  Scott Arfield
  Milan Borjan
  Kadeisha Buchanan
  Alphonso Davies
  Stephen Eustáquio
  Cyle Larin
  Richie Laryea
  Kamal Miller
  Jonathan Osorio
  Sophie Schmidt
  Christine Sinclair
  Steven Vitória
  Joel Waterman
Cape Verde
  Jovane Cabral
  Djaniny
  Carlos Ponck
  Garry Rodrigues
Central African Republic
  Geoffrey Kondogbia
Chile
  Tomás Alarcón
  Charles Aránguiz
  Karen Araya
  Ben Brereton
  Paulo Díaz
  Mauricio Isla
  Felipe Mora
  María José Rojas
  Erick Pulgar
  Enzo Roco
  Diego Rubio
  Alexis Sánchez
  Eduardo Vargas
  Arturo Vidal 
China
  Alan
  Tyias Browning
  Elkeson
  Wu Haiyan
  Yan Junling
  Nico Yennaris
  Wu Lei
  Wei Shihao
  Wang Shuang
  Zhang Yuning
Colombia
  Steven Alzate
  Carlos Bacca
  Miguel Borja
  Rafael Borré
  Edwin Cardona
  Diego Chará
  Yimmi Chará
  Jhon Córdoba
  Gustavo Cuéllar
  Radamel Falcao
  José Izquierdo
  Jefferson Lerma
  Alfredo Morelos
  Luis Muriel
  Jeison Murillo
  Helibelton Palacios
  Juan Quintero
  Hugo Rodallega
  Davinson Sánchez
  Mateus Uribe
  Duván Zapata
Comoros
  Fouad Bachirou
  El Fardou Ben
  Faïz Selemani
Costa Rica
  Celso Borges
  Francisco Calvo
  Joel Campbell 
  Cristian Gamboa
  Randall Leal
  Rónald Matarrita
  Bryan Oviedo
  Bryan Ruiz
Côte d'Ivoire
  Serge Aurier
  Jérémie Boga
  Willy Boly
  Idrissa Doumbia
  Seko Fofana
  Jean-Philippe Gbamin
  Gervinho
  Lago Júnior
  Nicolas Pépé
  Ibrahim Sangaré
  Jean Michaël Seri
  Wilfried Zaha
Croatia
  Borna Barišić
  Filip Benković
  Domagoj Bradarić
  Josip Brekalo
  Marcelo Brozović
  Neven Đurasek
  Luka Ivanušec
  Mateo Kovačić
  Dominik Livaković
  Lovro Majer
  Luka Modrić
  Mislav Oršić
  Ivan Perišić
  Bruno Petković
  Ante Rebić
  Mile Škorić
  Simon Sluga
  Domagoj Vida
  Nikola Vlašić
  Šime Vrsaljko
Cuba
  Onel Hernández
Curaçao
  Vurnon Anita
  Brandley Kuwas
  Cuco Martina
  Armando Obispo
  Eloy Room
Cyprus
  Georgios Efrem
  Alex Gogić
  Ioannis Pittas
Czech Republic
  Ondřej Čelůstka
  Bořek Dočkal
  Adam Hložek
  Jakub Jankto
  Pavel Kadeřábek
  Tomáš Kalas
  Adam Karabec
  Tomáš Koubek
  Alex Král
  Ladislav Krejčí
  Lukáš Masopust
  Aleš Matějů
  Filip Novák
  Jiří Pavlenka
  Jakub Pešek
  Michal Sadílek
  Patrik Schick
  Matěj Vydra
Denmark
  Joachim Andersen
  Peter Ankersen
  Alexander Bah
  Martin Braithwaite
  Andreas Cornelius
  Anders Christiansen
  Mikkel Damsgaard
  Thomas Delaney
  Christian Eriksen
  Pernille Harder
  Mathias Jensen
  Jens Jønsson
  Mathias Jørgensen
  Nicolai Jørgensen
  Simon Kjær
  Jonas Lössl
  Joakim Mæhle
  Andreas Skov Olsen
  Yussuf Poulsen
  Kasper Schmeichel
  Robert Skov
  Pione Sisto
  Erik Sviatchenko
  Daniel Wass
  Jonas Wind
Dominican Republic
  Mariano Díaz
  Carlos Julio Martínez
  Heinz Mörschel
DR Congo
  Benik Afobe
  Britt Assombalonga
  Cédric Bakambu
  Yannick Bolasie
  Gaël Kakuta
  Arthur Masuaku
  Marcel Tisserand
Ecuador
  Robert Arboleda
  Moisés Caicedo
  José Cifuentes
  Pervis Estupiñán
  Carlos Gruezo
  Gonzalo Plata
  Ángelo Preciado
  Ayrton Preciado
  Cristian Ramírez
  Enner Valencia
Egypt
  Afsha
  Karim Hafez
  Ahmed Hassan
  Omar Marmoush
  Mostafa Mohamed
  Amr El Solia
  Trézéguet
  Zizo
England
  Tammy Abraham
  Marc Albrighton
  Cameron Archer
  Patrick Bamford
  Ross Barkley
  Ashley Barnes
  Marcus Bettinelli
  Ryan Bertrand
  Lucy Bronze
  Jack Butland
  Gary Cahill
  Steven Caulker
  Trevoh Chalobah
  Calum Chambers
  Ben Chilwell
  Tom Cleverley
  Nathaniel Clyne
  Fabian Delph
  Ben Davies
  Eric Dier
  Danny Drinkwater
  Ryan Fredericks
  Phil Foden
  Ben Foster
  Conor Gallagher
  Morgan Gibbs-White
  Connor Goldson
  Jack Grealish
  Marc Guéhi
  Jack Harrison
  Joe Hart
  Kortney Hause
  Tom Heaton
  Dean Henderson
  Jordan Henderson
  Rob Holding
  Mason Holgate
  Danny Ings
  Phil Jagielka
  Reece James
  Curtis Jones
  Harry Kane
  Michael Keane
  Jonjoe Kenny
  Ryan Kent
  Fran Kirby
  Jamaal Lascelles
  Andy Lonergan
  Ademola Lookman
  John Lundstram
  Teden Mengi
  James Milner
  Tyrone Mings
  Mason Mount
  Eddie Nketiah
  Sheyi Ojo
  Alex Oxlade-Chamberlain
  Cole Palmer
  Nick Pope
  Marcus Rashford
  Danny Rose
  Jadon Sancho
  Ryan Sessegnon
  Billy Sharp
  Jonjo Shelvey
  Oliver Skipp
  Chris Smalling
  Emile Smith Rowe
  John Stones
  Daniel Sturridge
  Matt Targett
  Ivan Toney
  Andros Townsend
  James Ward-Prowse
  Ben White
  Alfie Whiteman
  Callum Wilson
  Ashley Young
Equatorial Guinea
  Sergio Akieme
  Emilio Nsue
Eritrea
  Henok Goitom
  Mohammed Saeid
Estonia
  Karl Hein
  Ragnar Klavan
  Karol Mets
  Rauno Sappinen
  Erik Sorga
  Joonas Tamm
  Georgi Tunjov
Faroe Islands
  Rógvi Baldvinsson
  Jóan Símun Edmundsson
  Hallur Hansson
  Gilli Rólantsson
Finland
  Paulus Arajuuri
  Marcus Forss
  Niko Hämäläinen
  Robert Ivanov
  Anssi Jaakkola
  Glen Kamara
  Joni Kauko
  Lassi Lappalainen
  Robin Lod
  Niki Mäenpää
  Simon Skrabb
  Tim Sparv
  Pyry Soiri
  Onni Valakari
France
  Rayan Aït-Nouri
  Jordan Amavi
  Benjamin André
  Adil Aouchiche
  Alphonse Areola
  Jonathan Bamba
  Eduardo Camavinga
  Mahdi Camara
  Étienne Capoue
  Joris Chotard
  Jonathan Clauss
  Benoît Costil
  Colin Dagba
  Kadidiatou Diani 
  Axel Disasi
  Ousmane Dembélé 
  Odsonne Édouard
  Nabil Fekir
  Yassin Fekir
  Kévin Gameiro
  Frédéric Guilbert
  Lucas Hernandez
  Theo Hernández
  Amandine Henry
  Franck Honorat
  Boubacar Kamara
  Presnel Kimpembe
  Anthony Knockaert
  Ibrahima Konaté
  Layvin Kurzawa
  Gaëtan Laborde
  Alexandre Lacazette
  Maxence Lacroix
  Kenny Lala
  Benjamin Lecomte
  Florian Lejeune
  Clément Lenglet
  Hugo Lloris
  Yann M'Vila
  Kévin Malcuit
  Blaise Matuidi
  Kylian Mbappé
  Bryan Mbeumo
  Nordi Mukiele
  Tanguy Ndombele
  Adrien Rabiot
  Valentin Rongier
  Jérôme Roussillon
  William Saliba
  Bouna Sarr
  Téji Savanier
  Jonathan Schmid
  Morgan Schneiderlin
  Djibril Sidibé
  Oumar Solet
  Flavien Tait
  Aurélien Tchouaméni
  Corentin Tolisso
  Lucas Tousart
  Marcus Thuram
  Dayot Upamecano
  Mathieu Valbuena
  Dan-Axel Zagadou
Gabon
  Pierre-Emerick Aubameyang
  Denis Bouanga
  Guélor Kanga
  Didier Ndong
Georgia
  Zuriko Davitashvili
  Valerian Gvilia
  Davit Khocholava
  Khvicha Kvaratskhelia
  Solomon Kvirkvelia
  Giorgi Makaridze
Germany
  Karim Adeyemi
  Nadiem Amiri
  Maximilian Arnold
  Karim Bellarabi
  Jérôme Boateng
  Julian Brandt
  Emre Can
  Gonzalo Castro
  Danny da Costa
  Sara Däbritz 
  Diego Demme
  Erik Durm
  Niclas Füllkrug
  Dennis Geiger
  Matthias Ginter
  Mario Götze
  Kai Havertz
  Marcel Halstenberg
  Ismail Jakobs
  Tony Jantschke
  Thilo Kehrer
  Joshua Kimmich
  Lukas Klostermann
  Robin Koch
  Maximilian Mittelstädt
  Kevin Möhwald
  Youssoufa Moukoko
  Jamal Musiala
  Shkodran Mustafi
  Marvin Plattenhardt
  David Raum
  Sebastian Rode
  Antonio Rüdiger
  Sebastian Rudy
  Leroy Sané
  Alexander Schwolow
  Suat Serdar
  Niklas Stark
  Lars Stindl
  Niklas Süle
  Felix Uduokhai
  Kevin Volland
  Luca Waldschmidt
  Matthias Zimmermann
Ghana
  Frank Acheampong
  Joseph Aidoo
  André Ayew
  Alexander Djiku
  Alfred Duncan
  Caleb Ekuban
  Mohammed Salisu
  Kamaldeen Sulemana
  Iñaki Williams
Gibraltar
  Liam Walker
  Scott Wiseman
Greece
  Anastasios Bakasetas
  Andreas Bouchalakis
  Stefanos Evangelou
  Giorgos Giakoumakis
  Orestis Karnezis
  Dimitris Kourbelis
  Giorgos Kyriakopoulos
  Charalampos Lykogiannis
  Kostas Manolas
  Petros Mantalos
  Alexandros Paschalakis
  Vangelis Pavlidis
  Panagiotis Retsos
  Georgios Tzavellas
  Odysseas Vlachodimos
Guadeloupe
  Mickaël Alphonse
  Matthias Phaeton
Guinea
  François Kamano
  Bengali-Fodé Koita
  Ilaix Moriba
  Seydouba Soumah
Haiti
  Derrick Etienne
  Duckens Nazon
Honduras
  Bryan Acosta
  Alberth Elis
  Anthony Lozano
  Bryan Róchez
  Romell Quioto
Hong Kong
  Shinichi Chan
  Yuen Ho Chun
  Yapp Hung Fai
  Law Tsz Chun
  Dai Wai Tsun
  Wong Wai
Hungary
  Bendegúz Bolla
  Tamás Cseri
  Dénes Dibusz
  Attila Fiola
  János Hahn
  László Kleinheisler
  Ádám Lang
  Ádám Nagy
  Loïc Négo
  Nemanja Nikolić
  Willi Orbán
  Roland Sallai
  Dániel Sallói
  András Schäfer
  Szabolcs Schön
  Dávid Sigér
  Ádám Szalai
  Attila Szalai
  Dominik Szoboszlai
  Kevin Varga
Iceland
  Hörður Björgvin Magnússon
  Kolbeinn Sigþórsson
  Arnór Sigurðsson
  Rúnar Már Sigurjónsson
  Arnór Ingvi Traustason
India
  Lallianzuala Chhangte
  Brandon Fernandes
  Seriton Fernandes
  Pritam Kotal
  Amrinder Singh
Indonesia
  Pratama Arhan
  Febri Hariyadi
  Stefano Lilipaly
  Egy Maulana
  Rizky Pora
  Terens Puhiri
Iran
  Mehdi Abdi
  Vahid Amiri
  Karim Ansarifard
  Sardar Azmoun
  Saeid Ezatolahi
  Mehdi Ghayedi
  Saman Ghoddos
  Ali Gholizadeh
  Majid Hosseini
  Abolfazl Jalali
  Hossein Kanaani
  Milad Mohammadi
  Sadegh Moharrami
  Siamak Nemati
  Ahmad Nourollahi
  Morteza Pouraliganji
  Ramin Rezaeian
  Mehdi Torabi
Iraq
  Ali Adnan
  Mohanad Ali
  Jiloan Hamad
  Justin Meram
Ireland
  Seamus Coleman
  Matt Doherty
  Shane Duffy
  Caoimhin Kelleher
  Shane Long
Israel
  Mu'nas Dabbur
Italy
  Francesco Acerbi
  Danilo D'Ambrosio
  Nicolò Barella
  Alessandro Bastoni
  Domenico Berardi
  Federico Bernardeschi
  Leonardo Bonucci
  Federico Chiesa
  Matteo Darmian
  Stephan El Shaarawy
  Alessandro Florenzi
  Pierluigi Gollini
  Manuel Locatelli
  Daniel Maldini
  Marco Parolo
  Lorenzo Pellegrini
  Matteo Pessina
  Andrea Pinamonti
  Matteo Politano
  Fabio Quagliarella
  Andrea Ranocchia
  Giacomo Raspadori
  Alessio Romagnoli
  Daniele Rugani
  Leonardo Spinazzola
  Rafael Toloi
  Sandro Tonali
  Marco Verratti
  Nicolò Zaniolo
  Simone Zaza
Jamaica
  Leon Bailey
  Andre Gray
Japan
  Junichi Inamoto
  Ko Itakura
  Hiroki Ito
  Daichi Kamada
  Daizen Maeda
  Yuto Nagatomo
  Masaya Okugawa
  Hiroki Sakai
  Takehiro Tomiyasu
  Ayase Ueda
Kazakhstan
  Nuraly Alip
  Bauyrzhan Islamkhan
  Alexander Merkel
  Bakhtiyar Zaynutdinov
Kosovo
  Arijanet Muric
Kuwait
  Ali Maqseed
Mali
  Moussa Djenepo
  Diadie Samassékou
Martinique
  Mickaël Malsa
Mexico
  Edson Álvarez
  Javier Aquino
  Néstor Araujo
  Rebeca Bernal
  Dayana Cázares
  Alicia Cervantes
  Jesús Corona
  Renae Cuéllar
  Belén Cruz
  Giovanni dos Santos
  Jonathan dos Santos
  Daniela Espinosa
  Jesús Gallardo
  Alison González
  Héctor Herrera
  Adriana Iturbide
  Raúl Jiménez
  Hirving Lozano
  Guillermo Ochoa
  Lizbeth Ovalle
  Joana Robles
  Viridiana Salazar
  Carlos Salcedo
Moldova
  Dumitru Celeadnic
  Eugeniu Gliga
  Adrian Hatman
Montenegro
  Esteban Saveljich
  Nikola Vukcevic
Morocco
  Bono
  Soufiane Chakla
  Oussama Idrissi 
  Yacine Qasmi
  Hakim Ziyech
Netherlands
  Nathan Aké
  Steven Berghuis
  Tahith Chong
  Matthijs de Ligt
  Stefan de Vrij
  Anwar El Ghazi
  Timothy Fosu-Mensah
  Hans Hateboer
  Vincent Janssen
  Frenkie de Jong
  Davy Klaassen
  Tim Krul
  Donyell Malen
  Tyrell Malacia
  Lieke Martens 
  Quincy Promes
  Karim Rekik
  Xavi Simons
  Kenneth Taylor
  Owen Wijndal
  Virgil van Dijk
  Joël Veltman
New Zealand
  Winston Reid
  Ali Riley
  Hannah Wilkinson
  Chris Woods
Nigeria
  Samuel Chukwueze
  Kelechi Iheanacho
  Alex Iwobi
  Olarenwaju Kayode
  Wilfred Ndidi
  Osinachi Ohale
  Asisat Oshoala
  Chinaza Uchendu 
North Macedonia
  Arijan Ademi
  Ezgjan Alioski
  Daniel Avramovski
  Enis Bardhi
  Egzon Bejtulai
  Eljif Elmas
  Ferhan Hasani
  Risto Jankov
  Marjan Radeski
  Erdal Rakip
  Milan Ristovski
  Stefan Ristovski
  Stefan Spirovski
  Vlatko Stojanovski
  Aleksandar Trajkovski
  Darko Velkovski
  Krste Velkoski
Northern Ireland
  Stuart Dallas
Norway
  Mohamed Elyounoussi
  Erling Haaland
  Caroline Graham Hansen
  Ada Hegerberg
  Joshua King
  Frida Maanum
  Håvard Nordtveit
  Martin Ødegaard
Peru
  Luis Advíncula
  Jefferson Farfán
  Sergio Peña
  Renato Tapia
Philippines
  Misagh Bahadoran
Poland
  Pawel Dawidowicz
  Kamil Glik
  Mateusz Klich
  Dawid Kownacki
  Robert Lewandowski
  Karol Linetty
  Przemysław Płacheta
  Maciej Rybus
  Sebastian Szymański
  Karol Świderski
  Jakub Swierczok
  Nicola Zalewski
  Piotr Zieliński
  Szymon Żurkowski
Portugal
  Bruno Alves
  João Cancelo
  William Carvalho
  Diogo Dalot
  Rúben Dias
  Bruno Fernandes
  José Fonte
  André Gomes
  Gonçalo Guedes
  Ricardo Horta
  João Mário
  João Mário
  Gelson Martins
  Luís Neto
  Pedro Neto
  Rúben Neves
  Danilo Pereira 
  Ricardo Quaresma
  Gonçalo Ramos
  Cristiano Ronaldo
  Nélson Semedo
  André Silva
  Fábio Silva
  Rafa Silva
  Cédric Soares
  Nuno Tavares
  Francisco Trincão
  VitinhaRepublic of the Congo  Silvère Ganvoula
  Dylan Saint-LouisRussia  Igor Akinfeev
  Dmitri Barinov
  Denis Cheryshev
  Igor Diveev
  Georgi Dzhikiya
  Artem Dzyuba
  Mário Fernandes
  Daniil Fomin
  Aleksandr Golovin
  Aleksei Ionov
  Vyacheslav Karavaev
  Aleksandr Kokorin
  Fyodor Kudryashov
  Daler Kuzyayev
  Andrei Mostovoy
  Magomed Ozdoev
  Andrei Semyonov
  Andrei Semyonov
  Edgar Sevikyan
  Anton Zabolotny
  Rifat Zhemaletdinov
  Roman ZobninSaudi Arabia  Salem Al-Dawsari
  Sultan Al-Ghanam
  Yasser Al-Shahrani
  Mohamed KannoScotland  Stuart Armstrong
  Liam Cooper
  Lyndon Dykes
  John Fleck
  Ryan Fraser
  Grant Hanley
  David Marshall
  Jack Hendry
  James McArthur
  John McGinn
  Kevin Nisbet
  Andrew Robertson
  Greg Taylor
  David TurnbullSenegal  Keita Baldé
  Boulaye Dia
  Amath Ndiaye
  Youssouf Sabaly
  Ismaïla Sarr
  Moussa WaguéSerbia  Srđan Babić
  Strahinja Eraković
  Mijat Gaćinović
  Marko Grujić
  Nemanja Gudelj
  Luka Ilić
  Filip Kostić
  Saša Lukić
  Filip Malbašić
  Erhan Mašović
  Sergej Milinković-Savić
  Vanja Milinković-Savić
  Aleksandar Mitrović
  Stefan Mitrović
  Nemanja Radoja
  Nemanja Radonjić
  Uroš Račić
  Dusan Tadic
  Miloš Veljković
  Dušan Vlahović
  Andrija ŽivkovićSlovakia  László Bénes
  Róbert Boženík
  Martin Dúbravka
  Marek Hamšík
  Tomáš Hubočan
  Martin Koscelník
  Juraj Kucka
  Stanislav Lobotka
  Róbert Mak
  Peter Pekarik
  Marek Rodak
  Vladimír Weiss
  Martin Valjent
  Denis VavroSlovenia  Josip IličićSouth Africa  Itumeleng KhuneSouth Korea  Cho Gue-sung
  Cho So-hyun
  Cho Yu-min
  Hwang Hee-chan
  Jang Sel-gi
  Jeong Woo-Yeong
  Ji So-yun
  Jung Woo-young
  Ki Sung-yueng
  Kim Min-jae
  Kim Moon-hwan
  Kim Tae-hwan
  Kwon Chang-hoon
  Lee Jae-sung
  Nam Tae-hee
  Paik Seung-ho
  Song Bum-keun
  Song Min-kyu
  Yoon Jong-gyuSpain  Angeliño
  Raúl Albiol
  Marcos Alonso
  Alejandro Balde
  Mikel Balenziaga
  Ander Barrenetxea
  Yuri Berchiche
  Sergio Busquets
  Ander Capa
  Kiko Casilla
  Dani Carvajal
  Dani Ceballos
  Jaume Costa
  Brahim Díaz
  Javi Díaz
  Óscar de Marcos
  Ansu Fati
  Kiko Femenía
  Junior Firpo
  Pablo Fornals
  Raúl García
  Raúl García
  Gavi
  Sergi Gómez
  Vicente Guaita
  Jason
  Joaquín
  Willian José
  Bojan Krkić
  Iñigo Lekue
  Diego Llorente
  Marcos Llorente
  Diego López
  Roger Martí
  Iñigo Martínez
  Omar Mascarell
  Borja Mayoral
  Édgar Méndez
  Jorge Molina
  Jesús Navas
  Unai Núñez
  Saúl Ñíguez
  Mikel Oyarzabal
  Pedro
  Yeremy Pino
  Pedro Porro
  Portu
  Riqui Puig
  Alexia Putellas
  Sergi Roberto
  Joel Robles
  Rodri
  Quini
  Robert Sánchez
  Salva Sevilla
  Denis Suárez
  Mario Suárez
  Nico Williams
  Adama Traoré
  Jesús VallejoSweden	
  Ludwig Augustinsson
  Felix Beijmo
  Viktor Claesson
  Anthony Elanga
  Emil Forsberg
  John Guidetti
  Zlatan Ibrahimović
  Daleho Irandust
  Pontus Jansson
  Dejan Kulusevski
  Jordan Larsson
  Sebastian Larsson
  Victor Lindelöf
  Kristoffer Olsson
  Martin Olsson
  Ken Sema
  Mattias Svanberg
  Isaac Kiese Thelin
  Kevin YakobSwitzerland  Manuel Akanji	
  Loris Benito
  Roman Bürki
  Eray Cömert
  Breel Embolo
  Christian Fassnacht
  Edimilson Fernandes
  Remo Freuler
  Mario Gavranović
  Jordan Lotomba
  Eldin Jakupovic
  Admir Mehmedi
  Yvon Mvogo
  Noah Okafor
  Bećir Omeragić
  Fabian Rieder
  Ricardo Rodriguez
  Xherdan Shaqiri
  Djibril Sow
  Renato Steffen
  Ruben VargasTogo  Emmanuel Adebayor
  DjenéTurkey  Emre Mor
  Cenk Tosun
  Hakan Çalhanoğlu
  Cenk Özkacar
  Çağlar Söyüncü
  Enes Ünal
  Okay YokuşluTrinidad and Tobago  Keston JulienUruguay  Ronald Araújo
  Giorgian de Arrascaeta
  Edinson Cavani
  Martín Cáceres
  Sebastián Coates
  José María Giménez
  Diego Laxalt
  Brian Lozano
  Darwin Núñez
  Mathías Olivera
  Facundo Pellistri
  Diego Rolán
  Federico Valverde
  Guillermo Varela
  Matías Vecino
  Matías ViñaUnited Arab Emirates  Omar AbdulrahmanUkraine  Roman Bezus
  Artem Bondarenko
  Artem Dovbyk
  Dmytro Kryskiv
  Sergiy Kryvtsov
  Andriy Lunin
  Yevhenii Makarenko
  Ruslan Malinovskyi
  Mykhailo Mudryk
  Marlos
  Sebastian Nanasi
  Ivan Petryak
  Denys Popov
  Oleksiy Shevchenko
  Marián Shved
  Andriy Totovytskyi
  Viktor Tsygankov
  Roman Yaremchuk
  Andriy Yarmolenko
  Illya Zabarnyi
  Oleksandr ZubkovUnited States  Christina Burkenroad
  Sergiño Dest
  Crystal Dunn
  Luca de la Torre
  Tim Howard
  Carli Lloyd
  Matt Miazga
  Alex Morgan
  Jordan Morris
  Carson Pickett
  Mallory Pugh
  Megan Rapinoe
  Zack Steffen
  Cameron Carter-VickersWales  Joe Allen
  Ethan Ampadu
  David Brooks
  Rhys Norrington-Davies
  Mark Harris
  Wayne Hennessey
  Hal Robson-Kanu
  Joe Morrell
  Aaron Ramsey
  Connor Roberts
  Joe Rodon
  Sorba Thomas
  Danny Ward
  Ben WoodburnVenezuela  Josef Martínez
  Salomón RondónZambia  Patson DakaZimbabwe'''
  Marvelous Nakamba

Notable former players

  Bledar Kola
  Ali Benarbia
  Sergio Agüero
  Julio Arca
  Roberto Ayala
  José Chamot
  Hernán Crespo
  Julio Cruz
  Kily González
  Gonzalo Higuaín
  Claudio López
  Javier Mascherano
  Ariel Ortega
  Bernardo Romeo
  Javier Saviola 
  Diego Simeone
  Carlos Tevez
  Pablo Zabaleta
  Alex Manninger
  John Aloisi
  Mark Bresciano
  Brett Emerton
  Vince Grella
  Harry Kewell
  Craig Moore
  Luke Wilkshire
  Nico Van Kerckhoven
  Émile Mpenza
  Wesley Sonck
  Yves Vanderhaeghe
  Marc Wilmots
  Sergej Barbarez
  Adriano Leite
  Aílton
  Dani Alves
  Márcio Amoroso
  Bebeto
  Roberto Carlos
  Júlio César
  Cicinho
  Denílson
  Doriva
  Edmundo
  Elano
  Evanílson
  Ewerthon
  Juninho Paulista
  Leonardo
  David Luiz
  Marcelo
  Marcelinho
  Neymar Jr.
  Alexandre Pato
  Ronaldo
  Ronaldinho
  Zé Roberto
  Romário
  Serginho
  Thiago Silva
  Wamberto
  Marc-Vivien Foe
  Geremi
  Lauren
  Rigobert Song
  Marcelo Salas
  Qi Hong
  Li Tie
  Didier Drogba
  Hamilton Ricard
  Juan Pablo Ángel
  Walter Centeno
  Alen Bokšić
  Mario Mandžukić
  Dado Pršo
  Mario Stanić
  Miroslav Baranek
  Milan Baroš
  Patrick Berger
  Radim Holub
  Jan Koller
  Tomáš Rosický
  Vladimír Šmicer
  Thomas Gravesen
  Jesper Grønkjær
  Niclas Jensen
  Allan Nielsen
  Dennis Rommedahl
  Stig Tøfting
  Peter Schmeichel
  Thomas Sørensen
  Antonio Valencia
  Tony Adams
  Gareth Barry
  James Beattie
  Darren Bent
  Marcus Bent
  Lee Bowyer
  Nicky Butt
  Sol Campbell
  Jamie Carragher
  Michael Carrick
  Malcolm Christie
  Andy Cole
  Ashley Cole
  Joe Cole
  Sean Davis
  Stewart Downing
  Dion Dublin
  Anton Ferdinand
  Les Ferdinand
  Rio Ferdinand
  Robbie Fowler
  Paul Gerrard
  Marcus Hall
  Emile Heskey
  Andy Hinchcliffe
  Francis Jeffers
  Jermaine Jenas
  Andy Johnson
  Nigel Martyn
  Paul Merson
  John Moncur
  Danny Murphy
  Neil Ruddock
  Scott Parker
  Jermaine Pennant
  Kevin Phillips
  Jamie Redknapp
  Dean Richards
  Michael Ricketts
  Paul Robinson
  Wayne Rooney
  Paul Scholes
  Jill Scott
  David Seaman
  Carl Serrant
  Alan Smith
  Graeme Le Saux
  Teddy Sheringham
  Trevor Sinclair
  Raheem Sterling
  John Terry
  Theo Walcott
  Steve Watson
  Jack Wilshere
  Ian Wright
  Shaun Wright-Phillips
  Jamie Vardy
  Darius Vassell
  Mikael Forssell
  Sami Hyypia
  Jonatan Johansson
  Joonas Kolkka
  Tim Sparv
  Éric Abidal
  Fabien Barthez
  Eric Cantona
  Kingsley Coman
  Ousmane Dabo
  Frederic Dehu
  Abou Diaby
  Lass Diarra
  Youri Djorkaeff
  Didier Domi
  William Gallas
  Remi Garde
  David Ginola
  Gilles Grimandi
  Thierry Henry
  Jean-Sébastien Jaurès
  Bixente Lizarazu
  Amel Majri
  Claude Makélélé
  Florent Malouda
  Steve Marlet
  Emmanuel Petit
  Franck Ribéry
  Laurent Robert
  Lilian Thuram
  Louis Saha
  Mikaël Silvestre
  Patrick Vieira
  Sylvain Wiltord
  Shota Arveladze
  Kakha Kaladze
  Jorg Albertz
  Oliver Bierhoff
  Christian Fiedler
  Steffen Freund
  Clemens Fritz
  Leon Goretzka
  Dietmar Hamann
  Jörg Heinrich
  Sami Khedira
  Miroslav Klose
  Jens Lehmann
  Stefan Reuter
  Matthias Sammer
  Marcel Schmelzer
  George Boateng
  Michael Essien
  Anthony Yeboah
  Nikos Dabizas
  Dimitrios Eleftheropoulos
  Grigoris Georgatos
  Theodoros Zagorakis
  Vahid Hashemian
  Jalal Hosseini
  Ali Karimi
  Mehdi Mahdavikia
  Keith Gillespie
  David Healy
  Aaron Hughes
  Neil Lennon
  Maik Taylor
  Thomas Butler
  Stephen Carr
  Steve Finnan
  Ian Harte
  Robbie Keane
  Gary Kelly
  Clinton Morrison
  Niall Quinn
  John O'Shea
  Gylfi Sigurðsson
  Demetrio Albertini
  Dino Baggio
  Massimo Brambilla
  Andrea Barzagli
  Fabio Cannavaro
  Benito Carbone
  Pierluigi Casiraghi
  Giuseppe Favalli
  Gennaro Gattuso
  Alberto Gilardino
  Filippo Inzaghi
  Paolo Maldini
  Marco Materazzi
  Vincenzo Montella
  Luca Percassi
  Andrea Pirlo
  Alessio Tacchinardi
  Damiano Tommasi
  Francesco Totti
  Christian Vieri
  Jason Euell
  Teruyoshi Ito
  Hidetoshi Nakata
  Marcus Tulio Tanaka
  Frédéric Kanouté
  Jared Borgetti
  Jorge Campos
  Salvador Carmona
  Javier Hernández
  Diego Lainez
  Rafael Marquez
  Alberto Medina
  Francisco Palencia
  Pavel Pardo
  David Rangel
  Gerardo Torrado
  Sinha
  Carlos Vela
  Cesáreo Victorino
  Titus Bramble
  Youssef Chippo
  Mustapha Hadji
  Frank De Boer
  Mark van Bommel
  Giovanni Van Bronckhorst
  Phillip Cocu
  Edgar Davids
  Fred Grim
  Jimmy Floyd Hasselbaink
  Klaas-Jan Huntelaar
  Patrick Kluivert
  Andy van der Meyde
  Ruud van Nistelrooy
  Arthur Numan
  Robin van Persie
  Bobby Petta
  Fernando Ricksen
  Remco van der Schaaf
  Wesley Sneijder
  Ronald Waterreus
  Sander Westerveld
  Richard Witschge
  Nordin Wooter
  Rafael van der Vaart
  Boudewijn Zenden
  Leo Bertos
  Tim Brown
  Glen Moss
  Ryan Nelsen
  Ben Sigmund
  Shane Smeltz
  Celestine Babayaro
  Finidi George
  Jay-Jay Okocha
  Nwankwo Kanu
  Tore André Flo
  John Arne Riise
  Eirik Bakke
  Henning Berg
  John Carew
  Steffen Iversen
  Ronny Johnsen
  Ole Gunnar Solskjær
  Nelson Valdez
  Nolberto Solano
  Tomasz Iwan
  Sérgio Conceição
  Rui Costa
  Dani
  Luís Figo
  Tiago Mendes
  Luís Boa Morte
  Nani
  Pauleta
  Andrey Arshavin
  Aleksei Berezutski
  Vasili Berezutski
  Aleksandr Mostovoi
  Alexey Smertin
  Yıldıray Baştürk
  Emre Belözoğlu
  Alpay Özalan
  Hakan Ünsal
  Hakan Şükür
  Arda Turan
  Dwight Yorke
  Billy Dodds
  Ian Durrant
  Barry Ferguson
  Darren Fletcher
  Paul Lambert
  Neil Lennon
  Dominic Matteo
  Stuart McCall
  Neil McCann
  Nigel Quashie
  David Weir
  Moussa N'Diaye
  Alassane Ndour
  Pape Thiaw
  Predrag Đorđević
  Dejan Stanković
  Vladimír Janočko
  Vladimír Labant
  Robert Koren
  Jan Oblak
  Shaun Bartlett
  Kim Byung-ji
  Lee Dong-gook
  Kim Dong-jin
  Song Chong-gug
  Ahn Jung-hwan
  Park Ji-sung
  Seol Ki-hyeon
  Francesc Arnau
  Jose Antonio Reyes
  David de Gea
  Luis Enrique
  Cesc Fàbregas
  Gabri
  Gerard
  Josep Guardiola
  Iván Helguera
  Andres Iniesta
  Juan Mata
  Gaizka Mendieta
  Iván de la Peña
  Gerard Piqué
  Carles Puyol
  Sergio Ramos
  Thiago
  Fernando Torres
  Sergio
  Victor Valdés
  Thomas Brolin
  Kim Källström
  Andreas Granqvist
  Freddie Ljungberg
  Olof Mellberg
  Johan Mjällby
  Mathias Svensson
  Johan Vonlanthen
  Raphaël Wicky
  Andriy Shevchenko
  Diego Godín
  DaMarcus Beasley
  Kyle Beckerman
  Edson Buddle
  Clint Dempsey
  Landon Donovan
  Mia Hamm
  Kasey Keller
  Christian Pulisic
  Earnie Stewart
  Eric Wynalda
  Savo Milošević
  Craig Bellamy
  Nathan Blake
  Ryan Giggs
  John Oster
  Ian Rush
  Gary Speed

Coaches

  Julian Nagelsmann

Football associations

  Australian Professional Leagues – Official match ball
 A-League Men
 A-League Women
  Campeonato Brasileiro – Official match ball
  Canadian Premier League – Official match ball
  Chinese Super League – All teams kits, Official match ball and referee kits
  Premier League – Official match ball and referee kit
  English Football League – Official referee kit
 EFL Cup
 EFL Championship
 EFL League One
 EFL League Two
 EFL Trophy
  The Football Association – Official referee kit
 FA Cup 
 FA Community Shield 
 FA Women's Super League 
 FA Women's Championship 
 FA Women's Cup 
 FA Women's Community Shield
  Féderation Française de Football
 Coupe de France – Official tournament ball
 Division 1 Féminine – Official match ball
 Coupe de France Féminine – Official match ball
  Serie D – Official match ball
  Lithuanian Football Federation
 A Lyga – Official match ball
 I Lyga – Official match ball
 Lithuanian Football Cup – Official tournament ball
  Russian Premier League - Official match ball
  K League – Official referee kits
 K League 1
 K League 2
  Kuwait Super Cup – Official tournament ball 
  Al-Roudan Tournament – Official tournament ball and the official tournament kits
  Saudi Premier League – Official match ball
  Qatar Stars League – Official match ball
  UAE Pro-League – Official match ball
  National Women's Soccer League - All teams kits and Official Tournament ball

Athletics

Nations

  Algeria
  Bahrain
  Brazil
  Botswana
  Burundi
  Canada
  China
  Colombia
  Denmark
  Djibouti
  Ecuador
  Eritrea
  Estonia
  Germany
  Great Britain
  Hungary
  Kenya
  Latvia
  Lesotho
  Mexico
  Qatar
  Russia
  Uganda
  United States
  Venezuela

Athletes
  Kenenisa Bekele
  Eliud Kipchoge
  Mo Farah
  Allyson Felix

Australian rules football
  Collingwood Football Club
  Sydney Swans

Baseball

Baseball national teams
  United States

Leagues
  MLB (all teams uniforms)

Basketball

Basketball national teams

  Angola
  Argentina
  Bahamas
  Bahrain
  Brazil
  Cape Verde.
  Cambodia
  Canada
  China
  Chinese Taipei
  Costa Rica
  Czech Republic
  Dominican Republic
  Georgia
  Greece
  Guyana
  Hong Kong
  Hungary
  Japan
  South Korea
  Libya
  Lithuania
  Netherlands
  Panama
  Philippines
  Puerto Rico
  Rwanda
  Senegal
  Slovenia
  Spain
  South Sudan
  Tunisia
  United States

Basketball clubs

  PS Karlsruhe LIONS
  Olympiacos
  South China AA
  Maccabi Tel Aviv
  Fortitudo Bologna
  Trento
  A.P.U. Udine
  Juventus
  Nevėžis
  Seoul SK Knights
  Asseco Prokom
  CSKA Moscow
  Barcelona
  Fenerbahçe

Basketball players

  Manu Ginóbili
  Pablo Prigioni
  Andrew Bogut
  Ben Simmons
  Mirza Teletović
  Leandro Barbosa
  Marcelo Huertas
  Tiago Splitter
  Anderson Varejão
  Joel Anthony
  Anthony Bennett
  Samuel Dalembert
  Cory Joseph
  Kelly Olynyk
  Tristan Thompson
  Al Horford
  Charlie Villanueva
  Boris Diaw
  Evan Fournier
  Rudy Gobert
  Zaza Pachulia
  Chris Kaman
  Dirk Nowitzki
  Luol Deng
  Joel Freeland
  Giannis Antetokounmpo
  Nick Calathes
  Kosta Koufos
  Andrea Bargnani
  Marco Belinelli
  Roy Hibbert
  Jonas Valančiūnas
  Pero Antić
  Nikola Vučević
  Jordan Clarkson
  Marcin Gortat
  J.J. Barea
  Timofey Mozgov
  Nikola Jokić
  Marc Gasol
  Pau Gasol
  Thabo Sefolosha
  Ömer Aşık
  Lavoy Allen
  Lou Amundson
  Chris Andersen
  Ryan Anderson
  Trevor Ariza
  Bam Adebayo
  Luke Babbitt
  Brandon Bass
  Bradley Beal
  DeJuan Blair
  Eric Bledsoe
  Devin Booker
  Trevor Booker 
  Miles Bridges
  Chris Bosh
  Elton Brand
  Kobe Bryant
  Kentavious Caldwell-Pope
  Vince Carter
  Michael Carter-Williams
  Tyson Chandler
  Wilson Chandler
  Caitlin Clark
  Norris Cole
  Nick Collison
  DeMarcus Cousins
  Jae Crowder
  Dante Cunningham
  Anthony Davis
  Ed Davis
  Glen Davis
  Mike Dunleavy Jr.
  Kevin Durant
  Wayne Ellington
  Tyreke Evans
  Landry Fields 
  De'Aaron Fox
  Markelle Fultz 
  Randy Foye
  Channing Frye 
  Harry Giles
  Rudy Gay
  Paul George
  Danny Granger
  Danny Green
  Tyler Hansbrough
  Tobias Harris
  Spencer Hawes
  Gordon Hayward
  Brendan Haywood
  JJ Hickson
  Kris Humphries
  Andre Iguodala
  Sabrina Ionescu
  Reggie Jackson
  Bronny James
  LeBron James
  Al Jefferson
  Richard Jefferson
  Haley Jones
  James Jones
  DeAndre Jordan
  Ryan Kelly
  Shane Larkin
  John Lucas III
  Shawn Marion
  Wesley Matthews
  Jason Maxiell
  O. J. Mayo
  Josh McRoberts 
  Paul Millsap
  Malik Monk 
  Ja Morant
  Nazr Mohammed
  Greg Monroe
  Jameer Nelson
  Royce O'Neale
  Patrick Patterson
  Paul Pierce
  Ronnie Price
  Tayshaun Prince
  Julius Randle
  JJ Redick
  Luke Ridnour
  Thomas Robinson
  Brandon Rush
  D'Angelo Russell
  Mike Scott
  Henry Sims
  Jason Smith
  J. R. Smith
  Amar'e Stoudemire 
  Marcus Thornton
  Ekpe Udoh
  DJ Wagner
  Dion Waiters
  Deron Williams
  Derrick Williams
  Brandan Wright
  Thaddeus Young

Notable former players
   Kyrie Irving
  Draymond Green
  Jayson Tatum

Associations
  NBA (all teams uniforms, 2017–) 
  WNBA 
  NBA D-League 
 FIBA (starting in 2017–18 season)

Boxing
  Gennady Golovkin
  Rex Tso

Cricket

Club teams

Australia 

  Adelaide Strikers
  Brisbane Heat
  Hobart Hurricanes
  Melbourne Renegades
  Melbourne Stars
  Perth Scorchers
  Sydney Sixers
  Sydney Thunder

England 

  Middlesex
  Northern Diamonds
  Sunrisers
  Worcestershire
  Yorkshire

CrossFit

Athletes
 Mat Fraser
 Josh Bridges
 Jeff Evans
 Lauren Fisher
 Nate Schrader
 Khan Porter
 Brandon Swan
 Kenny Leverich
 Jacob Heppner
 Alexandra LaChance

Teams
 CrossFit Invictus Team
 CrossFit Flare Kuwait

Figure Skating

 Evgenia Medvedeva
 Zahra Lari
 Nathan Chen

Esports

Teams

 Barça Esports
 DUSTY
 Eintracht Frankfurt Esports
 Fnatic (as collaboration)
 Galatasaray Espor
 Giants Gaming
 Goliath Gaming
 Hertha BSC eSport
 IF Parla Esports
 J Team
 KOI
 KRC Genk Esports
 Papara Supermassive
 Paris Saint-Germain Esports
 RBLZ Gaming
 Sporting CP Esports
 T1 (as footwear and fitness partner only)
 VfL Wolfsburg E-Sport

Players
 Cherrygumms
 Faker
 Rekkles
 Uzi

Futsal
 Pesaro Calcio a 5
 Sporting CP Futsal
 KPRF
 Sinara Yekaterinburg
 FC Barcelona Futsal
 Prodexim Kherson

Golf

  Tiger Woods
  Rory McIlroy
  Jason Day 
  Thomas Pieters
  Paul Casey
  Tommy Fleetwood
  Ross Fisher
  Sam Horsfield
  Tom Lewis
  Chris Wood
  Alexander Levy
  Romain Wattel
  Shubhankar Sharma
  Francesco Molinari
  Lucas Bjerregaard
  Thorbjørn Olesen
  Dylan Frittelli
  Alex Norén
  Marcus Kinhult
  Tony Finau
  Doug Ghim
  Russell Henley
  Tom Kim
  Brooks Koepka
  Nelly Korda
  Patrick Reed
  Julian Suri
  Nick Watney
  Matthew Wolff
  Jhonattan Vegas
  Suzann Pettersen
  Michelle Wie

Gymnastics
  Simone Biles

Handball
 Filippos Veria
 United States national team

Mixed Martial Arts
  Junior dos Santos
  Anderson Silva

Netball
 Collingwood Magpies Netball

Rugby union
  Argentina
  Fiji
  South Africa (From 2023)
  Jaguares
  Racing 92
  RC Toulonnais
  Stade Toulousain

Skateboarding

  Sky Brown
  Rayssa Leal
  Nicole Hause
  Stefan Janoski
  Elissa Steamer
  Korahn Gayle
  Mason Silva
  Dashawn Jordan
  Hayley Wilson
  Max Geronzi
  Grant Taylor
  Shane O'Neill
  Donovon Piscopo
  Daan Van Der Linden
  Hugo Boserup
  Caleb Barnett
 Oskar Rozenberg-Hallberg
  Kevin Bradley
  Antonio Durao
  Leo Baker
  Sean Malto
  Sarah Meurle
  Nyjah Huston
  
  Letícia Bufoni
  
  Casper Brooker
  
  Carlos Ribeiro
  Hjalte Halberg
  Ishod Wair
 
 Guy Mariano
 
Bobby Worrest
 Blake Carpenter
 Paul Rodriguez
 Sandy Bodecker
 Lance Mountain
 Luan Oliveira
 Eric Koston
 Jacopo Carozzi
 Cyrus Bennett
 Theotis Beasley
 Brian Anderson
 Nick Boserio
 Kyron Davis
 John Fitzgerald
 
 Yuto Horigome
 Yuri Facchini
 
 Karsten Kleppan
 
 
 
 Vincent Touzery
 Younness Amrani

Snowboarding 

Nike decided to end its snowboarding program in September 2014, however the company still has snowboarders on their streetwear team.
  Mark McMorris
  Cai Xuetong
  Ayumu Hirano
 Chloe Kim

Swimming 

While Nike doesn't produce competitive swimwear, they have still signed as the official dryland sponsor of several swimmers around the world.

  Simone Manuel
  Ariarne Titmus

Tennis

  Nick Kyrgios
  Ajla Tomljanović (to 2020)
  Victoria Azarenka
  Aryna Sabalenka
  Grigor Dimitrov
  Tsvetana Pironkova (to 2018)
  Bianca Andreescu
  Félix Auger-Aliassime (to 2021)
  Eugenie Bouchard (to 2021)
  Denis Shapovalov
  Wang Xinyu
  Wang Xiyu
  Wang Yafan
  Zhang Shuai (to 2017)
  Zheng Saisai
  Zheng Qinwen
  Borna Ćorić (to 2020)
  Donna Vekić
  Petra Kvitová
  Markéta Vondroušová
  Carlos Alcaraz
  Paula Badosa
  Rafael Nadal
  Anett Kontaveit (shoes only)
  Océane Dodin
  Caroline Garcia (to 2020)
  Holger Rune
  Sabine Lisicki
  Katie Boulter
  Kyle Edmund
  Emma Raducanu
  Maria Sakkari (to 2020)
  Leander Paes
  Sara Errani
  Lorenzo Musetti
  Jannik Sinner
  Naomi Osaka
  Elena Rybakina (to 2020)
  Iga Świątek (to 2020)
  Ana Bogdan
  Simona Halep
  Vitalia Diatchenko
  Karen Khachanov
  Daria Kasatkina (to 2021)
  Veronika Kudermetova (to 2020)
  Daniil Medvedev (shoes only)
  Anastasia Pavlyuchenkova (shoes only)
  Anastasia Potapova
  Andrey Rublev
  Elena Vesnina (to 2018)
  Belinda Bencic
  Anna Karolína Schmiedlová
  Marta Kostyuk
  Elina Svitolina
  Dayana Yastremska (to 2019)
  Amanda Anisimova
  Lauren Davis (to 2018)
  Taylor Fritz
  Sofia Kenin (to 2019)
  Madison Keys
  Sloane Stephens
  Frances Tiafoe
  Serena Williams
  Venus Williams (shoes only)

Retired players

  Juan Martín del Potro
  Natasha Zvereva
  Li Na
  Lucie Šafářová
  Conchita Martínez
  Carlos Moyá
  Amélie Mauresmo
  Mary Pierce
  Laura Robson
  Roberta Vinci
  Ilie Năstase
  Anastasia Myskina
  Maria Sharapova
  Amanda Coetzer
  Roger Federer
  Daniela Hantuchová
  Andre Agassi
  CiCi Bellis
  James Blake
  Lindsay Davenport
  Mary Joe Fernández
  Pete Sampras
  Monica Seles

North American colleges and universities

  Abilene Christian Wildcats
  Academy of Art Urban Knights
  Adelphi Panthers
  Air Force Falcons
  Akron Zips
  Alabama A&M Bulldogs and Lady Bulldogs
  Alabama Crimson Tide
  Alabama–Huntsville Chargers
  Alaska Anchorage Seawolves
  Alaska Nanooks
  Albany Great Danes
  Albany State Golden Rams
  Alberta Golden Bears and Pandas
  Alderson Broaddus Battlers
  Appalachian State Mountaineers
  Arizona Wildcats
  Arkansas Razorbacks
  Arkansas Tech Wonder Boys and Golden Suns
  Army Black Knights
  Assumption Greyhounds
  Augustana Vikings
  Aurora Spartans
  Azusa Pacific Cougars
  Ball State Cardinals
  Bard Raptors
  Barry Buccaneers
  Baruch Bearcats
  Baylor Bears and Lady Bears
  Belhaven Blazers
  Bellarmine Knights
  Belmont Bruins
  Benedict Tigers
  Berry Vikings
  Bethune–Cookman Wildcats
  Binghamton Bearcats
  Birmingham–Southern Panthers
  Bluefield State Big Blues
  Bluffton Beavers
  Boise State Broncos
  Bowdoin Polar Bears
  Bowling Green Falcons
  Brandeis Judges
  Brenau Golden Tigers
  Brevard Tornados
  Brock Badgers
  Brown Bears
  Bryn Mawr Owls
  Buffalo Bulls
  Buffalo State Bengals
  Butler Bulldogs
  BYU Cougars
  California Golden Bears
  Cal Maritime Keelhaulers
  Cal Poly Humboldt Lumberjacks
  Cal Poly Mustangs
  Cal Poly Pomona Broncos
  Cal State Fullerton Titans
  Cal State Los Angeles Golden Eagles
  Cal State San Marcos Cougars
  Canisius Golden Griffins
  Carlow Celtics
  Carnegie Mellon Tartans
  Carroll Fighting Saints
  Carthage Firebirds
  Case Western Reserve Spartans
  Casper Thunderbirds
  Catawba Indians
  Central Arkansas Bears and Sugar Bears
  Central Connecticut Blue Devils
  Central Missouri Mules and Jennies
  Central Oklahoma Bronchos
  Central State Marauders and Lady Marauders
  Chaminade Silverswords
  Chapman Panthers
  Charleston Golden Eagles
  Charlotte 49ers
  Chicago State Cougars
  CCNY Beavers
  Clark Atlanta Panthers
  Clayton State Lakers
  Clemson Tigers
  Cleveland State Vikings
  Coker Cobras
  Colorado Buffaloes
  Colorado Christian Cougars
  Columbia Lions
  Columbus State Cougars
  Concordia College Cobbers
  Concordia Stingers
  Coppin State Eagles
  Cornell Big Red
  Covenant Scots
  Creighton Bluejays
  CIA Steels
  Dalton State Roadrunners
  Dartmouth Big Green
  Dayton Flyers
  Delaware State Hornets
  Denison Big Red
  DePaul Blue Demons
  Dickinson State Blue Hawks
  Dominican Chargers
  Drew Rangers
  Drexel Dragons
  Duke Blue Devils
  Duquesne Dukes
  D'Youville Saints
  Earlham Quakers
  East Georgia State Bobcats
  East Tennessee State Buccaneers
  EBTU Tigers
  Eckerd Tritons
  Edward Waters Tigers and Lady Tigers
  Embry–Riddle Eagles
  Emerson Lions
  Emory Eagles
  Evansville Purple Aces
  Fairfield Stags
  Findlay Oilers
  Florida A&M Rattlers and Lady Rattlers
  Florida Gators
  Florida Gulf Coast Eagles
  Florida State Seminoles
  Fort Valley State Wildcats
  Fort Wayne Mastodons
  Furman Paladins
  Gannon Golden Knights
  George Fox Bruins
  Georgetown Hoyas
  Georgia Bulldogs
  Georgia College Bobcats
  Georgia Gwinnett Grizzlies
  Georgia Highlands Chargers and Lady Chargers
  Gonzaga Bulldogs
  Gordon State Highlanders
  Goshen Maple Leafs
  Governors State Jaguars
  Grace Lancers
  Grand Canyon Antelopes
  Hampden–Sydney Tigers
  Harvard Crimson
  Hawaii Pacific Sharks
  Hofstra Pride
  HIU Royals
  Houston Cougars
  Hunter Hawks
  Idaho Vandals
  Illinois Fighting Illini
  Illinois State Redbirds
  Indiana Tech Warriors
  Indianapolis Greyhounds
  Indiana Wesleyan Wildcats
  Iowa Hawkeyes
  Iowa State Cyclones
  Jacksonville Dolphins
  James Madison Dukes
  John Jay Bloodhounds
  Jones Bobcats
  Kansas State Wildcats
  Keene State Owls
  Kentucky State Thorobreds and Thorobrettes 
  Kentucky Wildcats
  Kenyon Owls
  King Tornado
  Lafayette Leopards
  Lane Dragons
  Lebanon Valley Flying Dutchmen
  Le Moyne Dolphins
  LeMoyne–Owen Magicians
  Lewis & Clark Pioneers
  Lewis–Clark State Warriors
  Liberty Flames and Lady Flames
  Lincoln Blue Tigers
  Linfield Wildcats
  Little Rock Trojans
  Lock Haven Bald Eagles
  Long Beach State Beach
  Loyola Ramblers
  LPU Warriors
  LSU Tigers and Lady Tigers
  Maine Maritime Mariners
  Manitoba Bisons
  Marist Red Foxes
  Marquette Golden Eagles
  Marshall Thundering Herd
  Maryland Eastern Shore Hawks
  Mayville State Comets
  Medgar Evers Cougars
  Memphis Tigers
  Metro State Roadrunners
  Michigan State Spartans
  Michigan Tech Huskies
  Michigan Wolverines
  Middle Georgia State Knights
  Middle Tennessee Blue Raiders
  Midwestern State Mustangs
  Miles Golden Bears
  Millsaps Majors
  MSOE Raiders
  Minnesota Golden Gophers
  Minnesota State Mavericks
  Mississippi Valley State Delta Devils and Devilettes
  Missouri S&T Miners
  Missouri Tigers
  Missouri Western Griffons
  Montana Grizzlies
  Montana State Billings Yellowjackets
  Morehouse Maroon Tigers
  Murray State Racers
  New Hampshire Wildcats
  New Mexico Lobos
  Niagara Purple Eagles
  Norfolk State Spartans
  North Carolina A&T Aggies
  North Carolina Central Eagles
  North Carolina Tar Heels
  North Dakota State Bison
  North Georgia Nighthawks
  North Greenville Crusaders
  North Idaho Cardinals
  North Texas Mean Green
  Northern Iowa Panthers
  Northern Michigan Wildcats
  Northern State Wolves
  Northwest Nazarene Nighthawks
  Nova Southeastern Sharks
  NWIC Eagles
  NYU Violets
  Oakland Golden Grizzlies
  Oberlin Yeomen and Yeowomen
  Oglethorpe Stormy Petrels
  Ohio Christian Trailblazers
  Ohio State Buckeyes
  Ohio Wesleyan Battling Bishops
  Oklahoma Sooners
  Oklahoma State Cowboys and Cowgirls
  Ole Miss Rebels
  Olivet Nazarene Fighting Tigers
  Oral Roberts Golden Eagles
  Oregon Ducks
  Oregon State Beavers
  Oswego State Lakers
  Oxford Bald Eagles
  Pace Setters
  Pacific Tigers
  Pacific University Boxers
  Paine College Lions
  Palm Beach Atlantic Sailfish
  Penn State Nittany Lions
  Penn Quakers
  Piedmont Lions
  Pitt Panthers
  Pomona-Pitzer Sagehens
  Point Loma Sea Lions
  Point Park Pioneers
  Portland Bible Wildcats
  Portland Pilots
  Portland State Vikings
  Princeton Tigers
  Providence Friars
  PUC Pioneers
  Puget Sound Loggers
  Purdue Boilermakers
  Queens College Knights
  Radford Highlanders
  Randolph Wildcats
  Reinhardt Eagles
  Rocky Mountain Battlin' Bears
  Roger Williams Hawks
  Roosevelt Lakers
  Rust Bearcats
  Saginaw Valley State Cardinals
  St. Francis Brooklyn Terriers
  St. John's Red Storm
  Saint Joseph's Hawks
  Saint Katherine Firebirds
  Saint Louis Billikens
  Saint Michael's Purple Knights
  St. Thomas Tommies
  Salem Tigers
  Samford Bulldogs
  San Diego State Aztecs
  San Diego Toreros
  San Francisco Dons
  San Francisco State Gators
  Santa Clara Broncos
  Sarah Lawrence Gryphons
  Staten Island Dolphins
  Savannah College of Art and Design Bees
  Savannah State Tigers and Lady Tigers
  SCAD Atlanta Bees
  Seattle Pacific Falcons
  SGTC Jets
  Simon Fraser Red Leafs
  Simpson Red Hawks
  SMU Mustangs
  Soka Lions
  South Carolina State Bulldogs and Lady Bulldogs
  Southwest Baptist Bearcats
  Southwestern Pirates
  Spring Hill Badgers
  Stanford Cardinal
  Stanislaus State Warriors
  Stetson Hatters
  Stony Brook Seawolves
  Syracuse Orange
  Tampa Spartans
  Tarleton State Texans
  TCU Horned Frogs
  Temple Owls
  Tennessee Volunteers
  Texas Longhorns
  Texas Wesleyan Rams
  Texas Woman's Pioneers
  The Master's Mustangs
  Thomas More Saints
  Thomas Night Hawks
  Toledo Rockets
  Transylvania Pioneers
  Tufts Jumbos
  Tulane Green Wave
  Tuskegee Golden Tigers
  UCCS Mountain Lions
  UCF Knights
  UCLA Bruins
  UConn Huskies
  UMD Wolverines
  UNC Greensboro Spartans
  Union University Bulldogs
  UNLV Rebels
  UPRB Cowboys and Cowgirls
  Upper Iowa Peacocks
  USC Trojans
  USC Upstate Spartans
  Utah State Aggies
  Utah Tech Trailblazers
  UTEP Miners
  Valdosta State Blazers
  Valley Forge Patriots
  Valparaiso Crusaders
  Vanderbilt Commodores
  Vanguard Lions
  Vassar Brewers
  VCU Rams
  Vermont Catamounts
  Villanova Wildcats
  Virginia Cavaliers
  Virginia Tech Hokies
  Wake Forest Demon Deacons
  Washington & Jefferson Presidents
  Washington and Lee Generals
  Washington State Cougars
  Washington University Bears
  Waterloo Warriors
  Wellesley Blue
  Western Carolina Catamounts
  West Florida Argonauts
  Westminster Titans
  West Virginia Mountaineers
  West Virginia State Yellow Jackets
  West Virginia Wesleyan Bobcats
  Western Kentucky Hilltoppers and Lady Toppers
  Westmont Warriors
  William Penn Statesmen
  Wilmington Quakers
  Wright State Raiders
  Xavier Musketeers
  Youngstown State Penguins

Artists

 Ludmilla
 Luísa Sonza
 J Balvin
 IDK
 Suzu Hirose
 JO1
 Loona
 Im Si-wan
 Atiwara Kongmalai
 Drake
 Billie Eilish
 Bella Hadid
 Eminem
 Kaws
 Travis Scott
 Skepta
 Will Smith
 Megan Thee Stallion

References

External links

 
 NikeInc.com – Business site

Sports sponsorships
Nike, Inc.